Novokračine is a village east of Jelšane in the Municipality of Ilirska Bistrica in the Inner Carniola region of Slovenia on the border with Croatia.

Mass graves
Novokračine is the site of four known mass graves or unmarked graves from the end of the Second World War. They contain the remains of German soldiers from the 97th Corps that fell at the beginning of May 1945. The Šušnjak Mass Grave, also known as the Šunčak Mass Grave, is located in the woods west of the village and contains the remains of up to 13 soldiers. The Kupnica Mass Grave encompasses two sites south of the settlement at former boneyard for dead livestock. They contain the remains of 70 and 12 soldiers, respectively. The Saint Catherine Mass Grave encompasses three or four sites below the summit of Saint Catherine's Hill with the remains of an unspecified number of soldiers. The Tenth Cross Grave lies in an overgrown depression on the west slope of Saint Catherine's Hill and contains the remains of one soldier.

Church
The local church in the settlement is dedicated to Saint Joseph and belongs to the Parish of Jelšane.

References

External links
Novokračine on Geopedia

Populated places in the Municipality of Ilirska Bistrica